Muhib ud-Din may refer to:

Muhibb-ud-Deen Al-Khatib, twentieth century Sunni who wrote against the Shi'a
Muhibb al-Din Abu Abdallah Mohammed ibn Umar ibn Rushayd al-Fihri al-Sabti, or briefly Mohammed ibn Rushayd (1259–1321), Moroccan judge, writer and scholar of Hadith
Almu'tasimu Billahi Muhibbudin Tuanku Alhaj Abdul Halim Mu'adzam Shah (etc. etc.) or Abdul Halim of Kedah (born 1927), Yang di-Pertuan Agong of Malaysia
Azlan Muhibbuddin Shah, or Azlan Shah of Perak (born 1928), Yang di-Pertuan Agong of Malaysia